This article lists the winners and nominees for the NAACP Image Award for Outstanding Jazz Artist. The award was first given during the 1980 ceremony and was later retired in 2011. Quincy Jones holds the record for most wins in this category with four.

Winners and nominees
Winners are listed first and highlighted in bold.

1980s

1990s

2000s

2010s

Multiple wins and nominations

Wins

 4 wins
 Quincy Jones

 2 wins
 Natalie Cole

Nominations

 4 nominations
 Quincy Jones

 3 nominations
 Wynton Marsalis

 2 nominations
 Gerald Albright
 Natalie Cole

References

NAACP Image Awards
Jazz awards